Ilija Vukotić (born 7 January 1999) is a Montenegrin professional footballer who plays as a midfielder for Primeira Liga club Boavista.

Club career
Vukotić began playing football competitively at the age of 12. On 21 March 2015, he scored a goal against Berane from distance in his debut for Grbalj, becoming the youngest goalscorer in the history of the Montenegrin First League at the age of 16.

International career
He made his debut for Montenegro national team on 13 November 2021 in a World Cup qualifier against the Netherlands. He came on as a substitute in the 69th minute with his country down 2–0 and scored in the 82nd minute, making the score 2–1 on the way to the eventual 2–2 final result.

Career statistics

Club

International

Scores and results list Montenegro goal tally first, score column indicates score after each Vukotić goal.

References

1999 births
Living people
Association football midfielders
Montenegrin footballers
Montenegro youth international footballers
Montenegro under-21 international footballers
Montenegro international footballers
FK Lovćen players
OFK Grbalj players
Vitória F.C. players
S.L. Benfica B players
Montenegrin First League players
Liga Portugal 2 players
Montenegrin expatriate footballers
Expatriate footballers in Portugal
Montenegrin expatriate sportspeople in Portugal